Horobivka is a village (selo) in northeast Ukraine, located in Kupiansk Raion (district) of Kharkiv Oblast (province). In 2001, it had a population of 263 people.

History

2020 Kharkiv Oblast forest fire 

In September 2020, the village almost completely burned down as a result of a forest fire in the wider Kharkiv region. The residents were evacuated. 22 houses were destroyed, leaving 33 people homeless.

2022 Russian invasion of Ukraine 

It was occupied by the Russian Armed Forces as part of the 2022 Russian invasion of Ukraine. On September 24, 2022, it was reported by Russian milbloggers that Ukrainian forces had recaptured the village as part of their wider counteroffensive in the Kharkiv region. Over the course of the next month, Russia made efforts to recapture the territory it lost in northeast Kharkiv Oblast, including Horobivka. An official from the self-proclaimed Luhansk People's Republic claimed Russian forces had recaptured Horobivka, but these claims could not be verified by the Institute for the Study of War.

Demographics 
In 2001, the village had 263 inhabitants. Of these, 243 spoke Ukrainian, and 20 spoke Russian.

References 

Villages in  Kupiansk Raion
Populated places established in 1799